A Utah Film Award (originally called a Filmed in Utah award) is an accolade by working film industry professionals in the United States to recognize outstanding achievement in film, series, and commercials. The annual presentation ceremony features performances by talented artists, and the presentation of those awards that have a more popular interest. It shares recognition of the film, television, and commercial industry as that of other performance arts: Emmy Awards (television), the Cleo Awards (commercial productions), and the Academy Awards (motion pictures).

The first Utah Film Awards was held March 2011 to honor Utah film-makers. The 4th Utah Film Awards ceremony was held March 21, 2014, at the Covey Center for the Arts in Provo to a sold-out house, and was broadcast online internationally.

References

2011 establishments in Utah
American film awards
Awards established in 2011